Agris Galvanovskis (born January 30, 1972) is a Latvian former professional basketball player and a current head coach for BK Liepājas Lauvas of the LBL.

Playing career
Galvanovskis played professional basketball for Latvian teams VEF Rīga, ASK Rīga, Princips, Bonus, Metropole, ASK/Brocēni/LMT and BK Gulbenes Buki. He also played for Latvian National Team.

Coaching career
Agris Galvanovskis began working as a basketball coach during his playing career with BK Gulbenes Buki when he coached local youth teams and was player-coach in his team. In 2006, he signed on as the assistant coach of BK Ventspils. In 2008, Galvanovskis was promoted to head coach of Ventspils team.

He won the 2009 Latvian Basketball League championship with Ventspils. He moved to BK Liepājas Lauvas in 2010 to work as head coach. Galvanovskis became the head coach of the Ukrainian club MBC Mykolaiv, in June 2012.

In 2008 and 2011, Galvanovskis coached Latvian U20 team.

References

External links 
FIBA Europe Player Profile
FIBA Europe Coach Profile

1972 births
Living people
Latvian basketball coaches
Latvian men's basketball players
People from Madona
Shooting guards